Sergei Nikolaevich Agashkov (born 16 November 1962) is Turkmen football manager and a former player. He is the manager of FShM Moscow. Although he is from Turkmenistan, he is of Russian origin.

Club career
He had spells at SKA Rostov-on-Don, Torpedo Moscow, Beitar Tel Aviv, POSCO Atoms and Ankaragücü.

Agashkov played seven seasons in the Soviet Top League, two with SKA Rostov-on-Don and five with Torpedo Moscow. He later played four seasons in the Russian Premier League, all of them with Torpedo Moscow.

External links

1962 births
Sportspeople from Ashgabat
Living people
Soviet footballers
Turkmenistan footballers
Association football midfielders
Soviet Top League players
FC SKA Rostov-on-Don players
FC Torpedo Moscow players
Beitar Tel Aviv F.C. players
Liga Leumit players
Expatriate footballers in Israel
Pohang Steelers players
K League 1 players
Expatriate footballers in South Korea
MKE Ankaragücü footballers
FC Torpedo-2 players
Expatriate footballers in Turkey
Russian Premier League players
Süper Lig players
Turkmenistan expatriate sportspeople in Israel
Turkmenistan expatriate sportspeople in South Korea
Turkmenistan expatriate sportspeople in Russia
Turkmenistan expatriate sportspeople in Turkey